This is a list of the municipalities in the province of Ávila, in the autonomous community of Castile and León, Spain. There are 248 municipalities.

See also 
Geography of Spain
List of Spanish cities

Notes

References 

 
Avila